Georges Leroux (born 1907, date of death unknown) was a French gymnast. He competed in seven events at the 1928 Summer Olympics.

References

1907 births
Year of death missing
French male artistic gymnasts
Olympic gymnasts of France
Gymnasts at the 1928 Summer Olympics
People from Pirmasens